Åsarp-Trädet FK is a Swedish football club located in Åsarp.

Background
Åsarp-Trädet FK currently plays in Division 4 Västergötland norra which is the sixth tier of  Swedish football. They play their home matches at Åsarps IP in Åsarp.

The club is affiliated to Västergötlands Fotbollförbund.

Footnotes

External links
 Åsarp-Trädet FK – Official website

Football clubs in Västra Götaland County